Paul Leahy may refer to:
 Paul Leahy, convicted murderer of Alexandra Zapp
 Paul Leahy (Saw), a character in the Saw films
Paul Conway Leahy (1904–1966), U.S. federal judge